Caldalkalibacillus uzonensis is a thermophilic, alkalitolerant, aerobic, heterotrophic spore-forming bacterium from the genus of Caldalkalibacillus which has been isolated from the hot spring Zarvarzin II from the East Thermal Field in Uzon Caldera in Russia.

References

External links 

Type strain of Caldalkalibacillus uzonensis at BacDive -  the Bacterial Diversity Metadatabase

Bacillaceae
Bacteria described in 2008